was a lieutenant general in the Imperial Japanese Army in World War II.

Biography
Shidei was born to a samurai-class family in Yamashina, Kyoto prefecture. He attended military preparatory schools in Osaka and Tokyo and graduated from the 27th class of the Imperial Japanese Army Academy in 1915. He served as a junior officer with a cavalry company in the IJA 23rd Infantry Regiment. In 1922, he graduated from the 34th class of the Army Staff College. He subsequently served as an instructor at the Army cavalry School as a military attache to Germany, and as an instructor at the Army Staff College. From August 1935 to March 1939, he served as an Aide-de-camp to the Emperor of Japan.  In August 1937, he was promoted to colonel.

In March 1939, Shidei was commander of the IJA 23rd Infantry Regiment. He was reassigned as an instructor at the Army Staff College from March 1940, and then as head of its Research Bureau from July 1940. He was promoted to major general in August 1940.

Recalled to combat duty in December 1942, Shidei served as Chief of Staff of the Japanese First Area Army, based in Manchukuo, He remained in this position to October 1944, when he was reassigned to take command of newly-formed IJA 94th Division.  This division was raised in Taiping, Perak to bolster Japanese defences in Malaya after the Japanese Army's defeat at the Battle of Imphal. The division was to be used to defend Malaya against the expected Operation Zipper, and took a defensive positions on the north of Malaysia.

In May 1945, Shidei was reassigned to command the Japanese Burma Area Army after the disastrous losses at the Battle of Meiktila and Mandalay and in Operation Dracula, but was recalled to Manchukuo in July 1945 to become Deputy Chief of Staff of the Kwantung Army.

Shidei died in a plane crash with Subhas Chandra Bose, when the Mitsubishi Ki-21 bomber they were in exploded and crashed at Taipei Songshan Airport shortly after takeoff on August 18, 1945, a few days after the official surrender of Japan. Shidei and Bose were en route to Dairen,  where Bose intended to speak with negotiators from the Soviet Union about political asylum and turning over control of the Indian National Army to the Soviets to continue the struggle for Indian independence. Shidei was to have served as the main liaison and negotiator for Bose. Conspiracy theories that the crash was not an accident appeared within hours of their deaths.

References

External links

Footnotes 

1895 births
1945 deaths
Japanese generals
Japanese military personnel of World War II
People from Kyoto
Victims of aviation accidents or incidents in Taiwan